Valea Carelor River may refer to one of the following rivers in Romania:

 Valea Carelor, a tributary of the Iza in Maramureș County
 Valea Carelor, a tributary of the Someșul Mare in Bistrița-Năsăud County